Weldon Springs is a spring in the city of Weldon Spring, in the U.S. state of Missouri.

Weldon Springs has the name of John and Joseph Weldon, pioneer citizens.

References

Bodies of water of St. Charles County, Missouri
Springs of Missouri